Marilee may refer to
Marilee, Texas, an unincorporated community in the United States
Murder of Marilee Bruszer in 1978 in the U.S. 
Marilee Jones (born 1951), dean of admissions at the Massachusetts Institute of Technology, U.S.
Marilee Lindemann, Professor of English at the University of Maryland, U.S.
Marilee Stepan (born 1935), American swimmer